Wayne Carlander is a retired American basketball player for the USC Trojans. A 6'6" power forward, Carlander finished his four-year career with 1,524 points and 767 rebounds in 116 games played. He lead the Trojans in scoring for three straight seasons (1983–85) and, as a senior, was named the Pac-10 Conference Men's Basketball Player of the Year. He was also the team captain for his junior and senior years.

Carlander was drafted in the 5th round of the 1985 NBA Draft (99th overall), but never made any NBA team's final roster. Instead, he played professionally in Spain for two years before returning to the United States to become a mortgage banker in Southern California.

References

Los Angeles Clippers all-time draft picks at basketball-reference
2008–09 USC Trojans men's basketball media guide

Year of birth missing (living people)
Living people
American expatriate basketball people in Spain
American men's basketball players
Basketball players from California
Los Angeles Clippers draft picks
Power forwards (basketball)
Sportspeople from Huntington Beach, California
USC Trojans men's basketball players